is a university hospital located in Chūō-ku, Osaka, Japan, affiliated with Osaka Dental University.

Medical Departments
This hospital has following departments:

Dental
 Operative Dentistry
 Endodontics
 Periodontics
 Geriatric Dentistry
 Fixed and Removable Prosthodontics and Occlusion
 Oral and Maxillofacial Surgery
 Diagnostic Imaging
 Orthodontics
 Pediatric Dentistry
 Dentistry for Disability and Oral Health
 Oral Implantology
 Anesthesiology
 Oral Diagnosis and Interdisciplinary Dentistry
 Oral Rehabilitation
 Interdisciplinary Dentistry

Medical
 Internal Medicine
 Otorhinolaryngology
 Ophthalmology

Special Clinics
 Dry Mouth
 Dry Eye
 Halitosis
 Aesthetic Dentistry
 Temporomandibular Joint Disease
 Oral Tumors
 Jaw Deformity
 Cleft Lip and Palate
 Center for Dental Sleep Medicine
 Sleep Apnea Syndrome
 Dental CAD/CAM Center

Access
 Keihan Electric Railway "Temmabashi Station"
 Osaka Metro Tanimachi Line "Temmabashi Station"

References

External links
 Official website
 Official website in English

Chūō-ku, Osaka
Dental hospitals
Hospital buildings completed in 1997
Hospitals established in 1913
Hospitals in Osaka
Teaching hospitals in Japan
1913 establishments in Japan